Arthur Cayley  (16 August 1821 – 26 January 1895) was a prolific British mathematician who worked mostly on algebra. He helped found the modern British school of pure mathematics.

As a child, Cayley enjoyed solving complex maths problems for amusement. He entered Trinity College, Cambridge, where he excelled in Greek, French, German, and Italian, as well as mathematics.  He worked as a lawyer for 14 years.

He postulated the Cayley–Hamilton theorem—that every square matrix is a root of its own characteristic polynomial, and verified it for matrices of order 2 and 3. He was the first to define the concept of a group in the modern way—as a set with a binary operation satisfying certain laws. Formerly, when mathematicians spoke of "groups", they had meant permutation groups. Cayley tables and Cayley graphs as well as Cayley's theorem are named in honour of Cayley.

Early years
Arthur Cayley was born in Richmond, London, England, on 16 August 1821. His father, Henry Cayley, was a distant cousin of Sir George Cayley, the aeronautics engineer innovator, and descended from an ancient Yorkshire family. He settled in Saint Petersburg, Russia, as a merchant. His mother was Maria Antonia Doughty, daughter of William Doughty. According to some writers she was Russian, but her father's name indicates an English origin. His brother was the linguist Charles Bagot Cayley. Arthur spent his first eight years in Saint Petersburg. In 1829 his parents were settled permanently at Blackheath, near London. Arthur was sent to a private school. At age 14 he was sent to King's College School. The school's master observed indications of mathematical genius and advised the father to educate his son not for his own business, as he had intended, but at the University of Cambridge.

Education
At the unusually early age of 17 Cayley began residence at Trinity College, Cambridge. The cause of the Analytical Society had now triumphed, and the Cambridge Mathematical Journal had been instituted by Gregory and Robert Leslie Ellis. To this journal, at the age of twenty, Cayley contributed three papers, on subjects that had been suggested by reading the Mécanique analytique of Lagrange and some of the works of Laplace.

Cayley's tutor at Cambridge was George Peacock and his private coach was William Hopkins. He finished his undergraduate course by winning the place of Senior Wrangler, and the first Smith's prize. His next step was to take the M.A. degree, and win a Fellowship by competitive examination. He continued to reside at Cambridge University for four years; during which time he took some pupils, but his main work was the preparation of 28 memoirs to the  Mathematical Journal.

As a lawyer
Because of the limited tenure of his fellowship it was necessary to choose a profession; like De Morgan, Cayley chose law, and was admitted to Lincoln's Inn, London on 20 April 1846 at the age of 24. He made a specialty of conveyancing. It was while he was a pupil at the bar examination that he went to Dublin to hear Hamilton's lectures on quaternions.

His friend J. J. Sylvester, his senior by five years at Cambridge, was then an actuary, resident in London; they used to walk together round the courts of Lincoln's Inn, discussing the theory of invariants and covariants. During this period of his life, extending over fourteen years, Cayley produced between two and three hundred papers.

As a professor
At Cambridge University the ancient professorship of pure mathematics is denominated by the Lucasian, and is the chair that had been occupied by Isaac Newton. Around 1860, certain funds bequeathed by Lady Sadleir to the university, having become useless for their original purpose, were employed to establish another professorship of pure mathematics, called the Sadleirian. The duties of the new professor were defined to be "to explain and teach the principles of pure mathematics and to apply himself to the advancement of that science." To this chair Cayley was elected when 42 years old. He gave up a lucrative practice for a modest salary; but he never regretted the exchange, for the chair at Cambridge enabled him to end the divided allegiance between law and mathematics, and to devote his energies to the pursuit that he liked best. He at once married and settled down in Cambridge. More fortunate than Hamilton in his choice, he enjoyed a home life of great happiness. His friend and fellow investigator, Sylvester, once remarked that Cayley had been much more fortunate than himself; that they had both lived as bachelors in London, but that Cayley had married and settled down to a quiet and peaceful life at Cambridge; whereas he had never married, and had been fighting the world all his days.

At first the teaching duty of the Sadleirian professorship was limited to a course of lectures extending over one of the terms of the academic year; but when the university was reformed about 1886, and part of the college funds applied to the better endowment of the university professors, the lectures were extended over two terms. For many years the attendance was small, and came almost entirely from those who had finished their career of preparation for competitive examinations; after the reform the attendance numbered about fifteen. The subject lectured on was generally that of the memoir on which the professor was for the time engaged.

The other duty of the chair — the advancement of mathematical science — was discharged in a handsome manner by the long series of memoirs that he published, ranging over every department of pure mathematics. But it was also discharged in a much less obtrusive way; he became the standing referee on the merits of mathematical papers to many societies both at home and abroad.

In 1872 he was made an honorary fellow of Trinity College, and three years later an ordinary fellow, which meant stipend as well as honour. About this time his friends subscribed for a presentation portrait. Maxwell wrote an address to the committee of subscribers who had charge of the Cayley portrait fund. The verses refer to the subjects investigated in several of Cayley's most elaborate memoirs; such as, Chapters on the Analytical Geometry of  dimensions; On the theory of Determinants; Memoir on the theory of Matrices; Memoirs on skew surfaces, otherwise Scrolls; On the delineation of a Cubic Scroll, etc.

In addition to his work on algebra, Cayley made fundamental contributions to algebraic geometry. Cayley and Salmon discovered the 27 lines on a cubic surface. Cayley constructed the Chow variety of all curves in projective 3-space. He founded the algebro-geometric theory of ruled surfaces.

In 1876 he published a Treatise on Elliptic Functions. He took great interest in the movement for the university education of women. At Cambridge the women's colleges are Girton and Newnham. In the early days of Girton College he gave direct help in teaching, and for some years he was chairman of the council of Newnham College, in the progress of which he took the keenest interest to the last.

In 1881 he received from the Johns Hopkins University, Baltimore, where Sylvester was then professor of mathematics, an invitation
to deliver a course of lectures. He accepted the invitation, and lectured at Baltimore during the first five months of 1882 on the
subject of the Abelian and Theta Functions.

In 1893 Cayley became a foreign member of the Royal Netherlands Academy of Arts and Sciences.

British Association presidency

In 1883 Cayley was President of the British Association for the Advancement of Science. The meeting was held at Southport, in the north of England. As the President's address is one of the great popular events of the meeting, and brings out an audience of general culture, it is usually made as little technical as possible.   took for his subject the Progress of Pure Mathematics.

The Collected Papers
In 1889 the Cambridge University Press requested him to prepare his mathematical papers for publication in a collected form—a request which he appreciated very much. They are printed in quarto volumes, of which seven appeared under his own editorship. While editing these volumes, he was suffering from a painful internal malady, to which he succumbed on 26 January 1895, in the 74th year of his age. When the funeral took place, a great assemblage met in Trinity Chapel, comprising members of the university, official representatives of Russia and America, and many of the most illustrious philosophers of Britain.

The remainder of his papers were edited by Andrew Forsyth, his successor in the Sadleirian Chair. The Collected Mathematical papers number thirteen quarto volumes, and contain 967 papers.  Cayley retained to the last his fondness for novel-reading and for travelling. He also took special pleasure in paintings and architecture, and he practiced water-colour painting, which he found useful sometimes in making mathematical diagrams.

Legacy
Cayley is buried in the Mill Road cemetery, Cambridge.

An 1874 portrait of Cayley by Lowes Cato Dickinson and an 1884 portrait by William Longmaid are in the collection of Trinity College, Cambridge.

A number of mathematical terms are named after him:

 Cayley's theorem
 Cayley–Hamilton theorem in linear algebra
 Cayley–Bacharach theorem
 Grassmann–Cayley algebra
 Cayley–Menger determinant
 Cayley diagrams – used for finding cognate linkages in mechanical engineering
 Cayley–Dickson construction
 Cayley algebra (Octonion)
 Cayley graph
 Cayley numbers
 Cayley's sextic
 Cayley table
 Cayley–Purser algorithm
 Cayley's formula
 Cayley–Klein metric
 Cayley–Klein model of hyperbolic geometry
 Cayley's Ω process
 Cayley surface
 Cayley transform
 Cayley's nodal cubic surface
 Cayley's ruled cubic surface
 The crater Cayley on the Moon (and consequently the Cayley Formation, a geological unit named after the crater)
 Cayley's mousetrap — a card game
 Cayleyan
 Chasles–Cayley–Brill formula
 Hyperdeterminant
 Quippian
 Tetrahedroid

Bibliography

See also 

 List of things named after Arthur Cayley

References

Sources

 (complete text at Project Gutenberg)

External links

 
 
 
 Arthur Cayley Letters to Robert Harley, 1859–1863. Available online through Lehigh University's I Remain: A Digital Archive of Letters, Manuscripts, and Ephemera.
 
 

 This article incorporates text from the 1916 Lectures on Ten British Mathematicians of the Nineteenth Century by Alexander Macfarlane, which is in the public domain.

1821 births
1895 deaths
Arthur
19th-century British mathematicians
Group theorists
Linear algebraists
Algebraic geometers
Graph theorists
People educated at King's College School, London
Newnham College, Cambridge
Alumni of Trinity College, Cambridge
Fellows of Trinity College, Cambridge
Fellows of the Royal Society
Fellows of the American Academy of Arts and Sciences
Foreign associates of the National Academy of Sciences
Members of the Royal Netherlands Academy of Arts and Sciences
Members of the Prussian Academy of Sciences
Members of the Hungarian Academy of Sciences
Presidents of the British Science Association
Presidents of the Royal Astronomical Society
Recipients of the Copley Medal
Royal Medal winners
De Morgan Medallists
Magic squares
Senior Wranglers
Sadleirian Professors of Pure Mathematics